Snēpele parish is an administrative unit of Kuldīga Municipality in the Courland region of Latvia. The parish has a population of 815 (as of 1/07/2010) and covers an area of 76.94 km2.

Villages of Snēpele parish 
 Kundi
 Snēpele
 Viesalgciems

See also 
 Curonian Kings
 Snēpele Palace

Parishes of Latvia
Kuldīga Municipality
Courland